Mokobulaan Pass is situated in the Mpumalanga province on the road between Lydenburg and Sudwala, South Africa.

Mountain passes of Mpumalanga